Bull Point Lighthouse is a lighthouse on Bull Point, about one mile (1.6 km) north of the village of Mortehoe, on the northern coast of Devon, England. The lighthouse provides a visual aid to the villages of Mortehoe, Woolacombe and Ilfracombe, and warns of the inhospitable and rocky coast that lines the area.

The old lighthouse
The original lighthouse was constructed in 1879 after a group of local "clergy, ship-owners, merchants and landowners" appealed to Trinity House for one. It was built on Bull Point, though the Maritime Corporations of the Bristol Channel seaboard had lobbied strongly for it to be placed offshore on the Morte Stone (a local hazard to shipping).

Inside, the light-source (a Douglass six-wick oil-powered lamp) was set within a revolving first-order optic, manufactured (along with the lantern) by Chance Brothers of Smethwick. The optic, consisting of three asymmetric lens panels backed by a dioptric mirror, was an early example of the application of group-flashing lens technology (introduced by Dr John Hopkinson of Chance Brothers in 1874). A fixed red sector light was also displayed, from a window in the tower, to mark the Morte Stone; this used light diverted by lenses from the landward side of the main light source.

A fog siren was also provided, powered by two 12 h.p. caloric engines (provided by Brown & co. of New York); it gave three blasts every two minutes. The fog signal equipment was housed in a separate engine room, built (together with a coke store and a small workshop) on the seaward side of the tower; it sounded through a single vertical horn, which was designed to rotate so that it could be angled to face into the wind when in use. On the landward side of the tower, a set of dwellings were constructed 'for two married keepers and one married assistant'. The dwellings, tower and engine room were linked by passageways; they were set, along with gardens and outbuildings, in a 12,000 sq ft compound.

In 1919 a new twin-siren fog signal was installed, sounded through a pair of 'Rayleigh trumpets', together with a new set of 24 h.p. Hornsby oil engines in the engine room providing compressed air.

The light was electrified in 1960 when the lighthouse was connected to mains electricity. Compressed air was provided by a pair of Reavell compressor sets (one diesel, the other electric) supplied by Petters Ltd (who also provided a standby generator in case the mains supply failed).

The new lighthouse
In September 1972 the headland on which the lighthouse stood subsided making the structure dangerous. Trinity House used an old light tower from Braunton Sands for two years whilst a new structure was rebuilt further inland. This was completed in 1974 at a cost of £71,000 and is currently in use; much equipment was reused from the old lighthouse, including the 1960 optic and fog signal. The sector light was also retained. The triple F-type diaphone foghorn was switched off in 1988, but inside the redundant equipment remains intact. The lighthouse was automated in 1995.

The site can be visited by an adjacent public footpath. The old lighthouse keepers' cottages are now being let out to tourists as self-catering holiday establishments.

Gallery

See also

 List of lighthouses in England

References

External links

 Trinity House

Lighthouses completed in 1879
Lighthouses in Devon
Bristol Channel